The Republican People's Party of Kazakhstan (QRHP) was an unregistered political party in Kazakhstan that existed from 1998 to 2001. The party was led by ex-Prime Minister of Kazakhstan Akezhan Kazhegeldin. The goal of the QRHP was to establish a democratic state with a socially oriented market economy. However, despite all the attempts, the party was never registered.

The QRHP, along with the People's Congress of Kazakhstan and Democratic Party Azamat was merged into United Democratic Party on 25 December 2001.

References

Defunct political parties in Kazakhstan
Political parties established in 1998